{{DISPLAYTITLE:C20H25NO3}}
The molecular formula C20H25NO3 (molar mass: 327.42 g/mol) may refer to:

 Benactyzine, an antidepressant
 Difemerine, an antimuscarinic
 Dimenoxadol, an opioid analgesic
 Panicudine, an alkaloid
 Traxoprodil, an NMDA antagonist